Gordon Audley (April 20, 1928 – October 1, 2012) was a Canadian speed skater and Olympic medalist. He was born in Winnipeg, Manitoba. He received a bronze medal at the 1952 Winter Olympics in Oslo, shared with Arne Johansen, after serving as Canada's flag bearer in the opening ceremonies. He was inducted into the Manitoba Sports Hall of Fame and Museum in 1988.

See also
Manitoba Sports Hall of Fame and Museum

References

External links
Gordon Audley's biography at Manitoba Sports Hall of Fame and Museum
Profile of Gordon Audley

1928 births
2012 deaths
Canadian male speed skaters
Speed skaters at the 1948 Winter Olympics
Speed skaters at the 1952 Winter Olympics
Speed skaters at the 1956 Winter Olympics
Olympic speed skaters of Canada
Medalists at the 1952 Winter Olympics
Olympic medalists in speed skating
Olympic bronze medalists for Canada
Speed skaters from Winnipeg
20th-century Canadian people